Yaylata is a protected area in Sveti Nikola village in Dobrich province, Bulgaria. It is part of the network of protected areas Natura 2000.

References 

Natura 2000 in Bulgaria